Fernando Bezerra de Sousa Coelho Filho (born 28 February 1984 in Recife) is Brazilian company administrator and politician formerly affiliated to the Brazilian Democratic Movement (MDB).

Personal life 
Son of senator Fernando Bezerra Coelho and Adriana Coelho.

Career 
He was the youngest federal deputy elected by the state of Pernambuco in the 2006 election. Currently, is minister of Mines and Energy of Brazil, appointed by president Michel Temer on 12 May 2016.

References

1984 births
Living people
Politicians from Recife
Brazilian Socialist Party politicians
Brazilian Democratic Movement politicians
Members of the Chamber of Deputies (Brazil) from Pernambuco
Energy ministers of Brazil